The State Oil Fund of the Republic of Azerbaijan or SOFAZ is a sovereign wealth fund founded in December 1999.

History and organization 
The State Oil Fund of the Republic of Azerbaijan (SOFAZ) was established by Heydar Aliyev's Decree No. 240 dated December 29, 1999. Statue of the State Oil Fund was approved by the Decree of the President of the Republic of Azerbaijan No. 434 dated December 29, 2000.

SOFAZ is headed by an Executive Director appointed and dismissed by the President. The general control over the activities of SOFAZ is carried out by the Supervisory Board. The main task of the Supervisory Board is to give a review on the draft annual budget prepared by SOFAZ Executive Director and reports on budget execution, annual reports and audit results of financial activities.

Executive Directors 
 Samir Sharifov — January 3, 2001 – April 18, 2006
 Shahmar Movsumov — May 15, 2006 – November 29, 2019
 Israfil Mammadov — November 29, 2019 – present

Awards 
 United Nations Public Service Awards — 2007
 EITI Award — 2009

Criticism 
SOFAZ has been criticized for lacking transparency in its finances and in its contracting, which has raised questions about corruption. Critics have described projects funded by SOFAZ as useless, and noted that contracts have been awarded to companies owned by the ruling Aliyev family in Azerbaijan.

References

Source 
 
 
 
 

Government agencies of Azerbaijan
Economy of Azerbaijan
Sovereign wealth funds
Petroleum economics
Petroleum organizations
1999 establishments in Azerbaijan
Organizations based in Baku